Mother Shipton's Cave (or "Old Mother Shipton's Cave") is at Knaresborough, North Yorkshire, England, near the River Nidd. Nearby is a petrifying well, also known as a dropping well. The latter is the oldest tourist attraction to charge a fee in England, and has been operated since 1630. The water of the well is so rich in sulphate and carbonate that artefacts may be put in the well to be "petrified" (encrusted) as a tourist attraction.

The place is associated with the legendary soothsayer and prophetess Mother Shipton, born Ursula Southeil, and reportedly the wife of Toby Shipton. According to legend, she was born in the cave. The cave and dropping well, together with other attractions, remain open to visitors and are run privately by Mother Shipton's Cave Ltd.

References

External links
 
 

Tourist attractions in North Yorkshire
Caves of North Yorkshire
Yorkshire folklore
Show caves in the United Kingdom
Knaresborough
Caves used for hiding